The Battle of Kasur (also known as the Sacking of Kasur) was a battle that took place in May of 1763, where the Sikh Misls united their forces against the Afghan forces of Kasur.The Sikhs successfully infiltrated Kasur and defeated the Afghan army.The Sikhs would sack the town and successfully retrieved a Hindu Brahmin's wife from the Afghans.

Background 
The Sikhs had gathered in Amritsar to celebrate the Vaisakhi festival which took place on 13 April 1763. During this time, some Brahmins complained about the treatment of Hindus under the Afghans of Kasur. Usman Khan an Afghan from Kasur had kidnapped a Hindu Brahmin's wife and converted her to Islam. 

Hari Singh Dhillon agreed to assist the Brahmins, but was opposed by the other Sikh leaders due to Kasur being well fortified with 12 forts. Nonetheless, Hari Singh insisted and Charat Singh also came to support him.

Battle
The combined Sikh armies marched from Amritsar, and were joined by more recruits as they advanced, and by the time they reached Kasur, the Sikh army amassed over 24,000 men. Some Sikh scouts were sent into Kasur to gain information, and learned that the town and the Afghans of Kasur were completely unaware of the Sikh advance. The Afghans also further spent the day in underground cells due to the summer heat. The Sikhs took advantage of the Afghans being completely unaware, and entered the town mid-day.

The Sikh armies infiltrating the city placed their own watchmen at the gates of the city which they closed, and communication was completely cut. The Sikhs then plundered the town, with Usman Khan and 500 of his men being killed in the ensuing chaos. The Brahmin Lady was also returned to her husband. Amidst the battle, Ghulam Muhiuddin Khan died fighting, and his nephew Hamid Khan begged Jhanda Singh for mercy, and ransomed himself for 400,000 rupees.

Aftermath
Following the capture of the city, Kasur was sacked, with large amounts of gold and jewels being seized by the Sikhs.

References

See also 

 Nihang
 Martyrdom and Sikhism

Battles involving the Sikhs